The 15th Test and Evaluation Squadron is a United States Air Force unit, stationed at Eglin Air Force Base, Florida and assigned to the 753rd Test and Evaluation Group.  It was first activated in the expansion of the United States military forces prior to World War II as the 15th Pursuit Squadron.  It moved to Panama in 1942, where it participated in the defense of the Panama Canal.  It returned to the United States, where it was a Replacement Training Unit for fighter pilots until 1944, when it was disbanded as the 15th Fighter Squadron in a reorganization of Army Air Forces training units in 1944

The squadron was reconstituted in the reserve from 1947 to 1949, but does not appear to have been fully manned or equipped with operational aircraft.  It was redesignated the 15th Fighter-Interceptor Squadron and served in the air defense of the United States from 1953 until inactivated in 1964, flying a series of more capable interceptor aircraft.  In 1967, it was redesignated the 15th Tactical Fighter Squadron and served for a year training McDonnell Douglas F-4 Phantom II pilots, mainly for the Vietnam War.

The squadron's second antecedent was activated in 1988 as the 2872d Test Squadron to perform flight tests on General Dynamics F-16 Fighting Falcons.  In 1992, the two squadrons were consolidated with the designation 15th Test Squadron.  The squadron was inactivated in 1994.

Redesignated the 15th Test Flight, the unit was reactivated in 2016 at Eglin Air Force Base, Florida.  It became the 15th Test and Evaluation Squadron in October 2021.

History

World War II
The first predecessor of the squadron was activated as the 15th Pursuit Squadron in early 1941 as part of the Southeast Air District.  It was equipped with a series of pursuit aircraft with a mission of air defense of Florida.   After the Pearl Harbor Attack, the squadron was assigned to the Caribbean Air Force in Panama where it operated in defense of the Panama Canal. It returned to the United States in early 1943 where it became a Republic P-47 Thunderbolt (later North American P-51 Mustang) replacement training unit  for III Fighter Command.  It was disbanded on 1 May 1944 as part of a reorganization of training units.

Air Defense

The squadron was reactivated in 1953 as the 15th Fighter-Interceptor Squadron, part of Air Defense Command. It was equipped with North American F-86A Sabre day fighters at Davis-Monthan Air Force Base, Arizona with a mission of air defense of the Southwest United States.   It Re-equipped in 1954 with North American F-86D Sabres. In 1957 it began re-equipping with the F-86L, an improved version of the F-86D which incorporated the Semi Automatic Ground Environment, or SAGE computer-controlled direction system for intercepts.  The service of the F-86L destined to be quite brief, since by the time the last F-86L conversion was delivered, the type was already being phased out in favor of supersonic interceptors.

In 1960 the squadron received the new McDonnell F-101B Voodoo supersonic interceptor, and the F-101F operational and conversion trainer.  The two-seat trainer version was equipped with dual controls, but carried the same armament as the F-101B and were fully combat-capable.  On 22 October 1962, before President John F. Kennedy told Americans that missiles were in place in Cuba, the squadron dispersed one third of its force, equipped with nuclear tipped missiles to Williams Air Force Base at the start of the Cuban Missile Crisis. These planes returned to Davis-Monthan after the crisis.

In the early 1960s, the Air Force implemented Project Clearwater, an initiative to withdraw Convair F-102 Delta Daggers from overseas bases in order to reduce "gold flow" (negative foreign currency transactions). By 1963, part of this plan called for the 16th Fighter-Interceptor Squadron at Naha Air Base to move to Davis-Monthan, permitting the 15th's F-101s to be distributed to other ADC squadrons.  Because there would be a gap between the transfer of the 15th's F-101s and the arrival of the 16th's F-102s, eight F-102s from Perrin Air Force Base would maintain alert at Davis-Monthan.  As another cost saving move, planning called for the 16th to be inactivated upon arrival at Davis-Monthan and the 15th to assume its aircraft.  However, the Gulf of Tonkin Incident intervened and the 16th was kept in the Pacific to maintain an air defense capability there.  Headquarters, USAF directed ADC to simply inactivate the 15th with no replacement.  The squadron degraded to a marginally combat ready status by October 1964 and was inactivated in December.

Flight test operations

The 2872d Test Squadron was activated at Hill Air Force Base, Utah to perform flight tests on General Dynamics F-16 Fighting Falcons that had undergone major overhaul or modification.  In 1992 the squadron was consolidated with the 15th Fighter-Interceptor Squadron as the 15th Test Squadron.

Lineage
15th Test Squadron
 Constituted as the 15th Pursuit Squadron (Interceptor) on 20 November 1940
 Activated on 15 January 1941
 Redesignated 15th Fighter Squadron on 15 May 1942
 Disbanded on 1 May 1944
 Reconstituted on 10 March 1947
 Activated in the reserve on 12 March 1947
 Inactivated on 27 June 1949
 Redesignated 15th Fighter-Interceptor Squadron on 11 February 1953
 Activated on 20 April 1953
 Discontinued and inactivated on 24 December 1964
 Redesignated 15th Tactical Fighter Squadron, activated and organized on 30 June 1967
 Discontinued and inactivated on 30 March 1968
 Consolidated on 1 October 1992 with the 2872d Test Squadron as the 15th Test Squadron
 Inactivated 1 April 1994
 Redesignated 15th Test Flight on 9 February 2016
 Activated on 1 March 2016
 Redesignated 15th Test and Evaluation Squadron on 1 October 2021

2872d Test Squadron
 Designated as the 2872d Test Squadron and activated on 15 January 1988
 Consolidated on 1 October 1992 with the 15th Fighter-Interceptor Squadron as the 15th Test Squadron

Assignments
 53d Pursuit Group (later 53d Fighter Group), 15 January 1941 – 1 May 1944
 Eleventh Air Force, 12 March 1947
 419th Troop Carrier Group, 30 September 1947 – 27 June 1949
 34th Air Division, 20 April 1953
 Los Angeles Air Defense Sector, 1 January 1960
 Phoenix Air Defense Sector, 1 May 1961 – 4 December 1964
 4531st Tactical Fighter Wing, 30 June 1967 – 30 March 1968
 Ogden Air Logistics Center, 15 January 1988
 545th Test Group, 21 March 1993 – 1 April 1994
 53d Wing, 1 March 2016
 753d Test and Evaluation Group, 1 October 2021 – present

Stations
 MacDill Field, Florida, 15 January 1941
 Dale Mabry Field, Florida, 8 May – 18 December 1941
 La Chorrera Airfield, Panama, 2 January – 10 November 1942
 Dale Mabry Field, Florida, 26 November 1942
 Drew Field, Florida, 6 January 1943
 Page Field, Florida, 5 February 1943 – 1 May 1944.
 Andrews Field (later Andrews Air Force Base), Maryland, 12 March 1947 – 27 June 1949.
 Davis Monthan Air Force Base, Arizona, 20 April 1953 – 4 December 1964
 Homestead Air Force Base, Florida, 30 June 1967 – 30 March 1968
 Hill Air Force Base, Utah, 15 January 1988 – 1 April 1994
 Eglin Air Force Base, Florida, 1 March 2016 – present

Aircraft

 Seversky P-35, 1941
 Curtiss P-40 Warhawk 1941
 Bell P-39 Airacobra, 1941–1943
 North American P-51 Mustang, 1943
 Republic P-47 Thunderbolt, 1943–1944
 North American F-86A Sabre, 1953
 North American F-86D Sabre, 1954–1957
 North American F-86L Sabre 1957–1959
 Northrop F-89J Scorpion, 1959–1960
 McDonnell F-101B Voodoo, 1960–1964
 McDonnell F-4 Phantom II, 1967-1968
 General Dynamics F-16 Fighting Falcon, 1988–1994

References

Notes
 Explanatory notes

 Citations

Bibliography

 
 
 
 McMullen, Richard F. (1964) "The Fighter Interceptor Force 1962-1964"  ADC Historical Study No. 27, Air Defense Command, Ent Air Force Base, CO (Confidential, declassified 22 March 2000)
 NORAD/CONAD Participation in the Cuban Missile Crisis, Historical Reference Paper No. 8, Directorate of Command History Continental Air Defense Command, Ent AFB, CO, 1 Feb 63 (Top Secret NOFORN declassified 9 March 1996)

0015
Military units and formations in Arizona